Trupanea solivaga is a species of tephritid or fruit flies in the genus Tephritomyia of the family Tephritidae.

Distribution
Argentina.

References

Tephritinae
Insects described in 1942
Diptera of South America